Donal Fox (born ) is an American composer, pianist and improviser in the jazz and classical genres. He was the first African-American composer-in-residence with the St. Louis Symphony (1991–1992). In 1993 he was a visiting artist at Harvard University. From 2009–2011, he was Martin Luther King Jr. Visiting Scholar at the Massachusetts Institute of Technology. Donal Fox is a Steinway Artist.

Fox's works have been performed at Carnegie Hall. The concerto "Peace Out" for Improvised Piano and Orchestra was premiered at Zankel Hall in 2009, where Fox was the piano soloist. "Peace Out" was commissioned and performed by the American Composers Orchestra. His piece, "Hear De Lambs A-Cryin," was performed at Stern Auditorium in 2011 by the Albany Symphony Orchestra.

Awards and honors
He received a 1997 Guggenheim Fellowship in music composition and a 1998 Fellowship from the Bogliasco Foundation.
In 2008, Fox was awarded the American Academy of Arts and Letters Academy Award in Music.

Relatives
Donal Fox is the eldest of six siblings. His brother Brian Fox is a computer programmer and the original author of GNU Bash shell. Donal is the paternal grandson of artist Daniel Fox, creator of the Monopoly Man.

References

Biography at AllAboutJazz.com
Biography at Schirmer.com
View From the East: The Talented Donal Fox

External links
 Bernsarts.com
 Donal Fox: performing at the Greene Space on April 24, 2013

1952 births
Living people
African-American artists
American artists
African-American classical pianists
American classical pianists
American male pianists
African-American jazz pianists
20th-century American pianists
21st-century classical pianists
20th-century American male musicians
21st-century American male musicians
21st-century American pianists
American male jazz musicians
20th-century African-American musicians
21st-century African-American musicians